The 54th edition of the World Allround Speed Skating Championships for Women took place on 6 and 7 February 1993 in Berlin at the Sportforum Hohenschönhausen ice rink.

Title holder was Gunda Kleemann from Germany.

Distance medalists

Classification

 DQ = Disqualified
 * = Fell

Source:

References

Attribution
In Dutch

1990s in speed skating
1990s in women's speed skating
1993 World Allround
1993 in women's speed skating